Resurrection High School is a private, Roman Catholic high school in Pascagoula, Mississippi.  It is located in the Roman Catholic Diocese of Biloxi.

History

The school was founded as the Academy of the Guardian Angels on October 6, 1882, by five Sisters of Perpetual Adoration with an initial enrolment of 47 students. By 1888, the Catholic population of Pascagoula had grown to 1,000 people. The first commencement exercises were held in 1889, wherein three students graduated.

In 1932, the Sisters of Perpetual Adoration officially changed the name of their religious order to the Sisters of the Most Holy Sacrament.

In 1937, Our Lady of Victories (as the school was now called) received certification by the State of Mississippi. A new school building was erected in 1947. The gymnasium was added in 1956. In 1959, a new grammar school was erected. In 1964, Sacred Heart Elementary School was dedicated and opened. 

In 1967, the high school became inter‑parochial with all area parishes assuming responsibility for its direction. In 1974, due to declining numbers, the Most Holy Sacrament Sisters relinquished leadership of the school. The Sisters formally withdrew in 1988, the same year that Bishop Howze announced the merger of OLV Central High School, OLV Elementary, and Sacred Heart Elementary School into one school system, Resurrection Catholic School.

Extracurricular activities
The Resurrection Catholic sports team mascot is the Eagle. RCHS has several sports teams, including Football, Track and Field, Cross Country, Fast and Slow pitch Softball, Soccer, Volleyball, Basketball, Tennis, Cheerleading, and Baseball. 
 
Clubs and activities at RCHS include:

National Honor Society
Key Club
Campus Ministry
Zonta Club
Mock Trial

Notes and references

External links
 School website

Educational institutions established in 1882
Roman Catholic Diocese of Biloxi
Catholic secondary schools in Mississippi
Schools in Jackson County, Mississippi
1882 establishments in Mississippi